Marius Jampolskis is a Lithuanian actor and TV host.

Film and television credits

References

External links 
 

Living people
1978 births
Lithuanian male television actors
Lithuanian male film actors
Actors from Kaunas
21st-century Lithuanian male actors